Newman University may refer to:

 Newman University, Birmingham, a university in Birmingham, England
 Newman University, Wichita, a Catholic liberal arts university in Wichita, Kansas, United States

See also
 Newman College (disambiguation)